Calosoma parvicollis is a species of ground beetle in the subfamily of Carabinae. It was described by Fall in 1910.

References

parvicollis
Beetles described in 1910